"Tres Delinquentes [sic]" is a song by American hip hop group Delinquent Habits from their debut studio album Delinquent Habits. It was written by Ivan "Ives Irie" Martin, David "Kemo The Blaxican" Thomas, Alejandro "O.G. Style" Martinez and Solomon "Sol Lake" Lachoff, with production helmed by O.G. Style. It was recorded at PMP Studio in Hollywood, California, and released through RCA Records on April 7, 1996 as a lead single from the album. It samples the jazz song "The Lonely Bull", performed by Herb Alpert. Reaching a peak position of number 35 on the US Billboard Hot 100, the single remained on the chart for a total of twenty weeks. There are English and Spanish versions of the song.
 
"Tres Delinquentes" was featured in the South Korean horror-comedy The Quiet Family (1998) and the film Havoc (2005). Los Angeles Dodgers outfielder Andre Ethier has frequently used "Tres Delinquentes" as his walk-up music when he bats at Dodger Stadium.

Track listing

Personnel

Ivan S. Martin – primary artist, rap vocals
David L.K. Thomas – primary artist, rap vocals
Alejandro R. Martinez – primary artist, producer, mixing
Dorian "Doe" Johnson – engineering, mixing
Davina Bussey – additional engineering
Paul Stewart – executive producer
Senen Reyes – executive producer
Thellus Singleton – cover art
Kimberly Felty – management
DJ Rif – remixing
Julio Gonzalez – remixing
Antonio Gonzalez – remixing
Mickey Petralia – remixing
Mario G. Caldato Jr. – remixing

Charts

References

External links

1996 songs
1996 singles
RCA Records singles